A yellowjacket is a black-and-yellow vespid wasp.

Yellowjacket(s) or Yellow Jacket(s) may also refer to:

Places
 Yellow Jacket, Colorado, an unincorporated town
 Yellow Jacket, Florida, an unincorporated area in Dixie County, Florida

Arts, entertainment, and media

Fictional characters
 Yellowjacket (Charlton Comics), the secret identity of Vince Harley, crime writer
 Yellowjacket (Marvel Comics)
 Yellowjacket (Rita DeMara), a supervillainess and later superheroine, and member of the Masters of Evil and Guardians of the Galaxy
 Darren Cross, the first villain fought by the second Ant-Man, Scott Lang
 Hank Pym, a founding member of the Avengers

Music
 Yellowjackets (band), an American jazz fusion quartet
 "Yellowjacket", a 2021 song by Spiritbox from Eternal Blue

Other uses in arts, entertainment, and media
 Yellow Jacket (newspaper), the student newspaper for Waynesburg University
 Yellowjackets (TV series), an American drama series broadcast from 2021

Organizations and political movements
 Yellow Jackets (Indiana), a mounted militia company present at the Battle of Tippecanoe
Yellow Jackets Movement, originally surrounding the French government's change of policy on diesel fuel.

Sports teams and mascots

College

 American International Yellow Jackets of Springfield, Massachusetts
 Cedarville University of Cedarville, Ohio
 Defiance College Yellow Jackets of Defiance, Ohio
 Georgia Tech Yellow Jackets of Atlanta, Georgia
 LeTourneau University YellowJackets of Longview, Texas
 Howard Payne University Yellow Jackets of Brownwood, Texas
 University Center Rochester Yellowjackets of Rochester, Minnesota
 University of Rochester Yellowjackets of Rochester, New York
 University of Wisconsin–Superior Yellowjackets of Superior, Wisconsin
Montana State University Billings Yellowjackets of Billings, Montana
Black Hills State University Yellow Jackets of Spearfish, South Dakota

High school
 Berkeley High School (California) Yellow Jackets
 Bessemer City High School (North Carolina) Yellow Jackets
Calhoun High School (Georgia) Yellow Jackets
East Haven High School Yellowjackets of East Haven, Connecticut
 Gwynn Park High School Yellow Jackets of Prince George's County, Maryland
 Irmo High School Yellowjackets of Irmo, South Carolina
 Ithaca High School (Michigan) Yellow Jackets
 Lee County High School (Sanford, North Carolina) Yellow Jackets
 Perrysburg High School Yellow Jackets
 Sprayberry High School Yellow Jackets
 Springfield High School (Tennessee)  Yellow Jackets

Other teams
 Frankford Yellow Jackets, a former National Football League team
 Iron Range Yellow Jackets, a former Junior "B" ice hockey team from Minnesota
 Pittsburgh Yellow Jackets, an amateur hockey team

Trees
 Corymbia bloxsomei, a tree native to Queensland, Australia. Commonly known as Yellow Jacket
 Corymbia bunites, a tree native to Queensland, Australia. Commonly known as the Blackdown Yellow Jacket
 Corymbia leichhardtii,  a tree native to Queensland, Australia. Commonly known as  Yellow Jacket or Rusty Jacket
 Corymbia leptoloma,  a tree native to Queensland, Australia. Commonly known as  Yellow Jacket or Paluma Range Yellow Jacket
 Eucalyptus similis, a tree native to Queensland. Commonly known as the Queensland Yellow Jacket or the Inland Yellow Jacket

Other uses
 Imperial yellow jacket, an Imperial honour in China during the Qing Dynasty
 Little Yellow Jacket, a bull used in bull riding
 The Yellow Jacket, original name of The Varsity, a restaurant established 1928 in Atlanta, Georgia
 Yellow Jacket Case, a smart-phone case that doubles as a stun-gun
 Pentobarbital, a sedative known on the street as "yellow jackets"
 Yellow jackets protests, in France from 2018